Johnny Sekka (born Lamine Sekka, 21 July 1934 – 14 September 2006) was a Senegalese actor.

Early life and move to Europe

He was born Lamine Sekka in Dakar, Senegal, the youngest of five siblings; his Gambian father died shortly after his birth. When he was still young, his Senegalese mother sent him to live with an aunt in Georgetown (now Janjanbureh) in the Gambia, but he ran away to live on the streets in the capital, then known as Bathurst (now Banjul).

During the Second World War he found employment as an interpreter at an American air base in Dakar. He then worked on the docks. When he was 20, he stowed away on a ship to Marseilles, France, and lived for three years in Paris.

He arrived in London, England in 1952, and served for two years in the Royal Air Force, where he first received the nickname "Johnny", but then Caribbean actor Earl Cameron persuaded him to become an actor, and he attended RADA. He became a stagehand at the Royal Court Theatre, and appeared on stage in various plays from 1958.

He had a small part in the 1958 film version of Look Back in Anger, directed by Tony Richardson, who had seen him on stage.  He took a leading role in the 1961 film Flame in the Streets, playing the Jamaican boyfriend of the (white) daughter (played by Sylvia Syms) of a liberal working-class trades unionist (played by John Mills).  He lived for a period in Paris, where he met his future wife, Cecilia Enger.

He continued in British films during the 1960s, portraying stereotypical roles, such as a manservant in the film Woman of Straw (1964), and in other films, such as East of Sudan (1964), Khartoum (1966) and The Last Safari (1967).  He also appeared on television, in programmes such as The Human Jungle, Z-Cars, Dixon of Dock Green, Gideon's Way, Danger Man, and a 1968 episode of The Avengers.

In 1968, he also played the lead role in a West End production of Night of Fame.  According to his obituary in The Times, this was the first time that a black actor had played a role written for a white man in English theatre.  He was seen as a British equivalent to Sidney Poitier, and was frustrated that actors who started out at around the same time as him – such as Sean Connery, Terence Stamp, Michael Caine, Tom Courtenay and John Hurt – had become stars, and he had not.

Later life

Sekka eventually moved to the United States with the aim of getting better roles. He had a minor part in the films A Warm December (1972) and Uptown Saturday Night (1974), both directed by Poitier.  The first also featured Earl Cameron and the second Bill Cosby and Richard Pryor. These roles led to a more memorable role in the sitcom Good Times, where he portrayed Ibe, Thelma's (BernNadette Stanis) African love interest. In 1976, he starred in the movie Mohammad, Messenger of God (also known as The Message) about the origin of Islam and the message of Muhammad, in which he played Muhammad's Ethiopian companion Bilal al-Habashi. He appeared in the 1982 film Hanky Panky, and played Banda in the 1984 miniseries Master of the Game.

He was not cast in Roots (1977), being considered insufficiently American, but secured a role in the sequel, Roots: The Next Generations (1979), playing an African interpreter. Sekka is widely known among science fiction fans for his role as Dr. Benjamin Kyle in the television series Babylon 5'''s pilot movie, The Gathering (1993).

Recurring health problems forced him to decline a future role in the series, and ultimately were the reason he retired from acting altogether.

Death
On 14 September 2006, Sekka died of lung cancer at his ranch in Agua Dulce, California, aged 72, survived by his wife Cecilia and son Lamine. He is buried at Holy Cross Cemetery, Culver City.

FilmographyFlame in the Streets (1961) – Peter LincolnThe Wild and the Willing (1962) – ReggieWoman of Straw (1964) – ThomasEast of Sudan (1964) – KimrasiKhartoum (1966) – KhaleelThe Last Safari (1967) – JamaThe Southern Star (1969) – MatakitIncense for the Damned (1970) – Bob KirbyThings Fall Apart (1971) Reou-Takh (1972) – Bob (uncredited)Charley One-Eye (1973) – Bob (uncredited)A Warm December (1973) – Dr. Joseph MyomoVisit to a Chief's Son (1974) – NemolokUptown Saturday Night (1974) – Geechie's HenchmanThe Message (1976) – BilalAshanti (1979) – Captain BradfordCharlie Chan and the Curse of the Dragon Queen (1981) – StefanHanky Panky (1982) – LaceyFever Pitch (1985) – ChocolatePassion and Paradise (1989) – Alfred AdderlyBabylon 5: The Gathering (1993) - Benjamin Kyle, M.D.

References

External links

Obituary at Variety.com (subscription required)
Obituary, The Independent, 29 September 2006
Obituary, The Guardian, 29 September 2006
 Obituary, The Times'', 5 October 2006 

1934 births
2006 deaths
People from Dakar
Senegalese male film actors
English male film actors
Senegalese people of Gambian descent
English people of Gambian descent
English people of Senegalese descent
Senegalese emigrants to the United Kingdom
Black British male actors
20th-century English male actors
English male television actors
Senegalese emigrants to the United States
Deaths from lung cancer in California
Burials at Forest Lawn Memorial Park (Hollywood Hills)
Male actors from Los Angeles County, California